Heino Heinaste (also Heinoste; until 1936 Hermann; 3 March 1928 – 25 June 2006) was an Estonian discus thrower and shot putter.

He was born in Tallinn.

He began athletics training in 1949, focusing on shot put and discus throw. He won bronze medal at 1954 European Athletics Championships – Men's shot put. He was multiple-time Estonian champion in shot put and discus throw. He was 5 times a member of Soviet Union, and 31 times Estonian national athletics team.

Personal best:
 shot put: 17.27 (1960)
 discus throw: 53.30 (1961)

References

1928 births
2006 deaths
Estonian male shot putters
Estonian male discus throwers
Soviet male shot putters
Athletes from Tallinn